The following is a list of individuals associated with Mount Holyoke College through attending as a student, or serving as a member of the faculty or staff.

Notable alumnae

Academics and scientists
 Clara Harrison Stranahan, 1849 - author; founder and trustee of Barnard College
 Harriet Newell Haskell, 1855 - educator and administrator 
 Lucy Myers Wright Mitchell, 1864 - one of the first female classical archaeologists
 Cornelia Clapp, 1871 - zoologist and marine biologist
 Mary Cutler Fairchild, 1875 - pioneering librarian
 Alice Carter Cook, circa 1888 - botanist and later faculty, first female recipient of an American botany PhD
 Marian E. Hubbard, 1889 - zoology professor
 Alice Huntington Bushee, 1891 - Spanish literature professor at Wellesley College
 Martha Warren Beckwith, 1893 - anthropologist
 Abby Howe Turner, 1896 - founded Mount Holyoke's department of physiology
 Caroline Ransom Williams, 1896 - the first female Egyptologist in North America
 Margaret Morse Nice, 1905 - ornithologist
 Alzada Comstock, 1910 - economics professor
 Mildred Sanderson, 1910 - mathematician
 Louise Freeland Jenkins, 1911 - astronomer
 Marion Elizabeth Blake, 1913 - classics professor
 Helen G. Fisk, 1917 - vocational services educator
 Rachel Fuller Brown, 1920 - chemist who discovered Nystatin
 Mildred Trotter, 1920 - forensic anthropologist
 Elizabeth K. Worley, 1924 - zoologist, microbiologist
 Lucy Weston Pickett, 1925 - chemist
 Helen Sawyer Hogg, 1926 - astronomer
 Alice Standish Allen, 1929 - the first female engineering geologist in North America
 Janet Wilder Dakin, 1933 - zoologist who was the youngest sister of Thornton Wilder and Charlotte Wilder
 Sara Anderson Immerwahr, 1935 - classical archaeologist
 Phoebe Stanton, 1937, architectural historian, professor at Johns Hopkins University, and active in urban planning for the city of Baltimore.
 Carolyn Shaw Bell, 1941 - economics professor
 Mary McHenry, 1954 - professor of English credited with introducing African American literature to Mount Holyoke
 Jane English, 1964 - physicist, translator, photographer
 Dolores Hayden, 1966 - professor of architecture, urbanism, and American studies
 Carolyn Collette, 1967 - professor of English
 Karen E. Rowe, 1967 - English professor at UCLA
 Susan Shirk, 1967 - professor of political science and the former Deputy Assistant Secretary of State for North Asia during the Clinton administration
 Susan B. Vroman, 1968 - Professor of Economics at Georgetown University
 Lila M. Gierasch, 1970 - professor of chemistry, biochemistry and molecular biology
 Melissa McGrath, 1977 - astronomer; Chief Scientist at NASA Marshall Spaceflight Center

Activists
 Lucy Stone, (attended 1839) - women's rights activist
 Olympia Brown, (attended 1854-55) - women's rights activist
 Helen Pitts, 1859 - women's rights activist, second wife of Frederick Douglass, and founder of the Frederick Douglass Memorial and Historical Association
 Eliza Read Sunderland, (graduated 1865) - writer, educator, lecturer, women's rights advocate
 Hortense Parker, 1883 -  daughter of African American abolitionist, John Parker and the first African American student to graduate from Mount Holyoke College
 Alice Bradford Wiles, 1873 - Chicago clubwoman
 Elizabeth Holloway Marston, 1915 - was the inspiration for Wonder Woman
 Ruth Muskrat Bronson, 1925 - poet, educator, Indian rights activist
 Sybil Bailey Stockdale, 1946 - founded the National League of Families of American Prisoners and MIAs in S.E. Asia; Lecturer; widow of '92 U.S. vice-presidential nominee, Adm. James Stockdale
 Nancy Skinner Nordhoff, 1954 - environmentalist and philanthropist; designated a Women’s History Month Honoree by the National Women’s History Project in 2006
 Gloria Johnson-Powell (Gloria Johnson), 1958 - child psychiatrist; an important figure in the Civil Rights Movement and the first African-American woman to attain tenure at Harvard Medical School
 Rose Dugdale - political activist and prominent member of the Provisional Irish Republican Army (IRA)
 Jody Cohen, 1976 - first woman rabbi in Connecticut history; leader in the Women's Rabbinic Network and Union for Reform Judaism
 Lynn Pasquerella, 1980 - medical ethicist; president, Mount Holyoke College; president of the Association of American Colleges and Universities
 Mallika Dutt, 1983 - executive director of Breakthrough, an international human rights organization
 Kavita Ramdas, 1985 - president and CEO, Global Fund for Women
 Marcia Hofmann, 2000 - digital rights attorney and activist

Actors, musicians, dancers and performers
 Elizabeth Eaton Converse - later known as Connie Converse, 1946 - singer and songwriter
 Caitlin Clarke (Katherine Clarke), 1974 - actress
 Michelle Hurst, 1974 - actress, known for her role as Miss Claudette on the Netflix series Orange Is the New Black
 Nancy Gustafson, 1978 - opera singer
 Melinda Mullins, 1979 - actress
 Donna Kane, 1984 - actress
 Geneva Carr, 1988 - actress, Tony Award nominee, main cast member in CBS television series Bull
 Kimberly Hebert Gregory, 1994 - actress
 Zeb Bangash, 2004 - part of Pakistani music duo Zeb and Haniya
 Zoe Weizenbaum, 2014 - actress, known for her roles in Memoirs of a Geisha and 12 and Holding
 Sho Madjozi, 2015 - South African rapper

Artists
 Esther Howland, 1847 - artist noted for her role in popularizing St. Valentine's Day cards
 Minerva J. Chapman, 1880 - painter
 Sarah A. Worden 1883–1891 - painter, art instructor
 Jane Hammond, 1972 - artist
 Susan Mohl Powers, 1966 - sculptor, painter
 Maia Cruz Palileo, 2001 - artist
 Zehra Laila Javeri - Pakistani artist

Athletes
 Stacy Apfelbaum - rowing cox; gold medal winner at the 1984 World Rowing Championships
 Margaret Hoffman, 1934 - swimmer who participated in both the 1928 Summer Olympics and 1932 Summer Olympics (200 m breaststroke) 
 Imogene Opton Fish, 1955 - alpine skier who was captain of the U.S. women's 1952 Winter Olympics ski team
 Michele Drolet, 1976 - blind cross-country skier who was the first American woman to ever earn a Paralympic cross-country skiing medal - bronze at the 1994 Winter Paralympics 
 Harriet (Holly) Metcalf, 1981 - executive director and founder of Row As One Institute who won a gold medal in rowing at the 1984 Summer Olympics
 Mary Mazzio, 1983 - filmmaker and Olympic athlete who participated in rowing at the 1992 Summer Olympics
 Olga Maria Sacasa, 1984 - cyclist was the first woman ever to represent Nicaragua in cycling, at the 1992 Summer Olympics
 Katheryn Curi, 1996 - cyclist who placed first at the National Road Race Championships in Park City, Utah in June 2005

Businesswomen
 Jean Picker Firstenberg, 1958 - director and CEO of the American Film Institute
 Mary Duffy, 1966 - feminist fashion expert, spokeswoman, entrepreneur, author, and motivational speaker, expanding concepts of beauty for the majority of women who do not fit ideal stereotypes popularized by fashion and media Big Beauties/Little Women, Ford Models 
 Barbara J. Desoer, 1974 - CEO for Citibank N.A. and a member of its board of directors
 Eileen Kraus, 1960 - trailblazing woman banker and president of Connecticut National Bank 
 Audrey A. McNiff, 1980 - managing director and co-head of Currency Sales, Goldman Sachs
 Vicki Roberts, 1980 - attorney, on-air legal commentator, television and film personality
 Barbara Cassani, 1982 - first leader of London's successful bid for the 2012 Summer Olympics
 Sheila Lirio Marcelo, 1993 - founder and CEO of Care.com

College presidents
 Susan Tolman Mills, 1845 - co-founder and first president of Mills College
 Ada Howard, 1853 - first president of Wellesley College
 Abbie Park Ferguson, 1856 - founder and president of Huguenot College
 Sarah Ann Dickey, 1869 - founder of Mount Hermon Female Seminary
 Florence M. Read, 1909 - former president, Spelman College
 Yau Tsit Law, 1916 - dean of women, Lingnan University
 Pauline Tompkins, 1941 - former president, Cedar Crest College
 Barbara M. White, 1941 - former president, Mills College
 Alice Stone Ilchman 1957 - former president, Sarah Lawrence College
 Elizabeth Topham Kennan, 1960 - former president, Mount Holyoke College
 Carol Geary Schneider, 1967 - president, Association of American Colleges and Universities
 Nancy J. Vickers, 1967 - president, Bryn Mawr College
 Elaine Tuttle Hansen, 1969 - president, Bates College
 Lynn Pasquerella, 1980 - president, Mount Holyoke College
 Leocadia I. Zak, 2018 - president, Agnes Scott College

Computer scientists and graphic designers
 Jean E. Sammet, 1948 - computer scientist who developed the FORMAC programming language
 Susan Kare, 1975 - original designer of many of the interface elements for the original Apple Macintosh.

Doctors, nurses and psychologists
 Nancy M. Hill, 1859 - Civil War nurse and one of the first female doctors in the U.S.
 Seraph Frissell, 1869 - physician, medical writer
 Mary Phylinda Dole, 1886, 1889 - became a doctor at a time when it was difficult for women to do so
 Dorothy Hansine Andersen, 1922 - doctor involved in cystic fibrosis research (first to identify the disease)
 Virginia Apgar, 1929 - doctor who developed the Apgar score for evaluating newborns; anesthesiologist
 Florence Wald 1938 - nurse who was the leader of the U.S. hospice movement
 Ellen P. Reese, 1948 - psychologist
 Abby Howe Turner - professor of physiology and zoology who founded the department of physiology at Mount Holyoke
 Gloria Johnson-Powell (Gloria Johnson), 1958 - child psychiatrist; an important figure in the Civil Rights Movement and the first African American woman to attain tenure at Harvard Medical School

Filmmakers, broadcast presidents, and producers

 Dulcy Singer, 1955 - former Emmy Award-winning producer of Sesame Street
 Julia Phillips (Julia Miller), 1965 - Hollywood producer and author
 Debra Martin Chase, 1977 - Hollywood producer
 Mary Mazzio, 1983 - filmmaker and Olympic athlete who participated in rowing at the 1992 Summer Olympics
 Sonali Gulati, 1996 - filmmaker and director of the film Nalini by Day, Nancy by Night
 Chloé Zhao, 2005 - Academy Award winner, director/filmmaker

Journalists
 Janet Huntington Brewster, 1933 - philanthropist, writer, and radio broadcaster; wife of Edward R. Murrow
 Beth Karas, 1979 - senior reporter, CourtTV
 Dari Alexander,  1991 - co-anchor of WNYW's weeknight 6 p.m. newscast, and previously a reporter and part-time anchor for the Fox News Channel

Judges
 Maryanne Trump Barry, 1958 - judge on the United States Court of Appeals for the Third Circuit; older sister of 45th president of the United States Donald Trump
 Janet Bond Arterton, 1966 - judge on the United States District Court for the District of Connecticut
 Janet C. Hall, 1970 - judge on the United States District Court for the District of Connecticut, chief judge of the District of Connecticut (2013–present)
 Glenda Hatchett, 1973 - judge on nationally syndicated television series, Judge Hatchett

Politics
 Louisa "Louise" Maria Torrey Taft, 1845 - mother of President William Howard Taft
 Frances Perkins, 1902 - first woman cabinet member (U.S. Secretary of Labor from 1933-1945 under President Franklin D. Roosevelt)
 Marion West Higgins, 1936 - first female Speaker of the New Jersey General Assembly
 Ella T. Grasso, 1940 - governor of Connecticut; the first female governor elected in her own right in United States history
Jetta Jones, 1947 - lawyer in Chicago, served in Mayor Harold Washington's administration
 Joanne H. Alter, 1949 - American activist and politician
 Nancy Kissinger (Nancy Maginnes), 1955 - philanthropist; wife of former U.S. Secretary of State Henry Kissinger
 Nita Lowey, 1959 - United States House of Representatives member (D-NY)
 Judith Kurland, 1967 - former regional director, United States Department of Health and Human Services
 Susan Shirk, 1967 - professor of political science and the former Deputy Assistant Secretary of State for North Asia during the Clinton administration
 Jane Garvey (Jane Famiano), 1969 (M.A.T.) - former head of Federal Aviation Administration (FAA)
 Elaine Chao, 1975 - U.S. Secretary of Transportation, 2017-2021, U.S. Secretary of Labor, 2001–2009; director of the Peace Corps, 1991–1992; former national director, United Way
 Susan Longley, 1978 - state senator and judge of probate from Maine
 Karen Middleton, 1988 - legislator in the U.S. state of Colorado
 Mona Sutphen, 1989 - Deputy White House Chief of Staff in the Obama administration
 Mahua Moitra, 1998 - member of Indian parliament, Lok Sabha
 Rabiya Javeri Agha, 1983 - a member of Pakistan Administrative Service, Pakistan Administrative Service

Writers

 Edna Dean Proctor, 1847 - poet
 Emily Dickinson, (attended 1847–1848) - poet
 Emily Gilmore Alden, 1855 - author and educator
 Julia Harris May, 1856 - poet, teacher, school founder
 Mary Eleanor Wilkins Freeman, (attended 1870–1871) - novelist and short story writer
 Anne W. Armstrong, (attended 1890–1892) - novelist
 Caroline Henderson, 1901 - Dust Bowl author
 Alice Geer Kelsey, 1918 - writer, children's literature
 Charlotte Wilder, 1919 - poet
 Kathryn Irene Glascock, 1922 - poet
 Constance McLaughlin Green, 1925 (master's degree) - historian who won the 1963 Pulitzer Prize for History for Washington, Village and Capital, 1800-1878
 Roberta Teale Swartz, 1925 - poet
 Virginia Hamilton Adair, 1933 - poet
 Martha Whitmore Hickman, 1947 - non-fiction author
 Nancy McKenzie, 1948 - Arthurian legend author
 Jean Rikhoff, 1948 - author
 Martha Henissart, 1950 - mystery author writing under the pen-name of Emma Lathen with Mary Jane Latsis
 Nancy Bauer (Nancy Luke), 1956 - non-fiction author
 Elizabeth Topham Kennan, 1960 - author writing under the pen-name of Clare Munnings with Jill Ker Conway
 Nancy Bond, 1966 - writer, children's literature
 Olivia Mellan, 1968 - author of 6 books on money psychology
 Patricia Roth Schwartz, 1968 - poet
 Kathleen Eagle (Kathleen Pierson), 1970 - romance novelist
 Marisabina Russo, 1971 - writer, children's literature
 Wendy Wasserstein, 1971 - playwright who won the 1989 Tony Award for Best Play and the 1989 Pulitzer Prize for Drama  for The Heidi Chronicles
 Lynne Barrett, 1972 - author
 Susan Shwartz, 1972 - science fiction and fantasy author
 Gjertrud Schnackenberg, 1975 - poet
 Kathleen Hirsch, 1975 - non-fiction author
 Judith Tarr, 1976 - science fiction and fantasy author
 Carol Higgins Clark, 1978 - mystery author
 Lan Cao, 1983 - novelist
 Suzan-Lori Parks, 1985 - playwright who won the 2002 Pulitzer Prize in Drama for Topdog/Underdog
 Deborah Harkness, 1986 - author of the New York Times best selling novel A Discovery of Witches
 Sehba Sarwar, 1986 - novelist
 C. Leigh Purtill, 1988 - young adult author
 Sabina Murray, 1989 - screenwriter; wrote screenplay for The Beautiful Country
 Sherri Browning Erwin, 1990 - author of Thornbrook Park and Jane Slayre, member of Romance Writers of America
 Tahmima Anam, 1997 - author
 Susan J. Elliott, 2000 - non-fiction author
 Betsy James, writer
 Hanna Pylväinen, 2007 - author of We Sinners
Katy Simpson Smith, ?2018 - novelist
 Hayeon Lim, 2017 - South Korean socialite and author

Fictional alumnae 

 Catherine, Black Widow
 Frances "Baby" Houseman, Dirty Dancing
 Sarah Gadon, Indignation
 Barbara Kornpett, The In-Laws
 Helen Bishop, Mad Men
 Bethany Van Nuys, Mad Men
 Judy Maxwell, What's Up Doc?
Rebecca Morgan, Chapelwaite

Notable faculty, past and present

Artists
 Leonard DeLonga - professor of art
 William Churchill Hammond - organist, choirmaster, chairman of music department
 (Charles) Denoe Leedy - concert pianist and music journalist
 Harrison Potter - concert pianist and accompanist
 David Sanford - professor of music
 Emmett Williams - artist in residence 1975-1976

Athletics
 Mary Ellen Clark - former head diving coach; diver who won two Olympic bronze medals at the 1992 Summer Olympics and the 1996 Summer Olympics

Authors, actors, poets, and playwrights
 Martha Ackmann - author and journalist
 Awam Amkpa - actor and playwright
 W.H. Auden - poet
 James Baldwin - Five Colleges faculty and American novelist
 Sven Birkerts - author, The Gutenberg Elegies
 Joseph Brodsky - winner of the 1987 Nobel Prize in Literature, and Poet Laureate of the United States for 1991–1992
 Luis Cernuda - poet
 Anita Desai - novelist
 Anthony Giardina - novelist
 John Irving - author of The Cider House Rules, and The World According to Garp
 Denis Johnston - playwright
 Brad Leithauser - author, poet
 Margaret Chai Maloney - author
 Jaime Manrique - author, poet
 Mary Olivia Nutting  - librarian and historian
 Valerie Martin - novelist and short story writer
 Mary Jo Salter - poet and a coeditor of The Norton Anthology of Poetry
 Bapsi Sidhwa - novelist
 Paul Smyth - poet
Ada L. F. Snell - poet
 Genevieve Taggard - poet
 Peter Viereck - 1949 Pulitzer Prize for Poetry for Terror and Decorum and professor of Russian History
 Richard Weber - Irish poet; visiting lecturer from 1967 to 1970 
 Douglas Whynott - author

Education
 Eunice Caldwell Cowles - assistant to Mary Lyon in the founding of Mount Holyoke Female Sminary
 Robert Hess (1938–1994) - president of Brooklyn College
 Mary Lyon - founder of Mount Holyoke Female Seminary in 1837 (later Mount Holyoke College)
 Beverly Daniel Tatum - president of Spelman College

Historians
 Michael Burns
 Joseph Ellis
 Robert Matteson Johnston
 Stephen F. Jones
 William S. McFeely
 Nellie Neilson
 Bertha Putnam
 Annah May Soule
 Peter Viereck

Humanities
 Christopher Benfey - professor of English
 Peter Berek - professor of English
 Marion Elizabeth Blake - classics professor
Flora Bridges - taught Greek and English
 Gordon Keith Chalmers - professor of English
 Carolyn Collette - professor of English
 Emmanuel Chukwudi Eze - philosopher
 Leah Blatt Glasser - dean of first-year studies and lecturer in English
 Mary McHenry - professor of English
 Indira Viswanathan Peterson - professor of Asian Studies
 William H. Quillian - professor of English
Clara F. Stevens - professor of English, department head
Ellen Bliss Talbot - professor of Philosophy and chair of the Department of Philosophy and Psychology for 32 years
 Jean Wahl - philosopher
 Donald Weber - professor of English
 Jon Western - professor of international relations
Mary Gilmore Williams - professor of Greek

Journalists
 Todd Brewster - journalist, author, film producer, and current senior visiting lecturer in journalism

Politics
 Shirley Chisholm - U.S. representative, 1968–1983, founding member of the Congressional Black Caucus, and simultaneously the first woman and the first African-American to run for U.S. president
 Ellen Deborah Ellis - founder and first chair of the political science department at the college
 Jean Grossholtz - professor emeritus of politics; bodybuilder who won a silver medal at the 1994 Gay Games
 W. Anthony Lake - U.S. National Security Advisor, 1993–1997
 Christopher Pyle - professor of politics, journalist and whistleblower
 Margaret Rotundo - Maine State legislator
 Cyrus Vance - U.S. Secretary of State, 1977–1980

Sciences and social sciences
 A. Elizabeth Adams - zoologist
 Katherine Aidala - physicist
 Mildred Allen - physicist
 Elisabeth Bardwell - astronomer
 Susan R. Barry - neurobiologist
 Grace Bates - mathematician
 John Bissell Carroll - psychologist
 Jill Bubier - environmental scientist
 Cornelia Clapp - zoologist and marine biologist
 Janet Wilder Dakin - zoologist, youngest sister of Thornton Wilder and Charlotte Wilder
 Ethel B. Dietrich - economist, foreign service officer
 Melinda Darby Dyar - planetary geologist, mineralogist, and spectroscopist 
 Joanne Elliott - mathematician
 Alice Hall Farnsworth - astronomer, director of the John Payson Williston Observatory
 Anna Lockhart Flanigen - chemistry professor from 1903 to 1910
 Dorothy Hahn - organic chemist
 Anna J. Harrison - organic chemist, first female President of the American Chemical Society
 Olive Hazlett - mathematician
 Amy Hewes - economist
 Karen Hollis - psychologist
 Janice Hudgings - physicist, former associate dean of faculty at Mount Holyoke College
 Elizabeth Laird - head of the physics department from 1903 to 1940
 Flora Belle Ludington - librarian
 Emilie Martin - mathematician 
 Mark McMenamin - paleontologist and geologist
 Ann Haven Morgan - zoologist
 Lucy Taxis Shoe Meritt, classical archaeologist and Greek scholar 
 Kerstin Nordstrom - physicist
 Donal O'Shea - mathematician 
 Harriet Pollatsek - mathematician 
 Becky Wai-Ling Packard - educational psychologist
 Lucy Weston Pickett - chemist
 Louise Fitz-Randolph, 1872 - art historian; established Department of Art and plaster cast collection in Dwight Art Memorial Building (forerunner of Mount Holyoke College Art Museum) 
 Ellen P. Reese - psychologist
 Margaret M. Robinson - mathematician
 Lydia Shattuck - botanist, founding member of the American Chemical Society
 Mignon Talbot - paleontologist who recovered and named the only fossils of the dinosaur Podokesaurus holyokensis
 Abby Howe Turner - founder of Mount Holyoke College's department of physiology
 Esther Boise Van Deman - archeologist
 Anne Sewell Young - astronomer, director of the John Payson Williston Observatory
 Antoni Zygmund - mathematician, co-founder of the Chicago school of mathematical analysis

Actors
 Michael Burns - Moondoggie in Gidget Gets Married, 1972

Presidents

A number of individuals have acted as head of Mount Holyoke. Until 1888, the term principal was used. From 1888 to the present, the term president has been used.

1837–1849: Mary Lyon, 1st president (founder and principal)
1849–1850: Mary C. Whitman, 2nd president (principal)
1850–1865: Mary W. Chapin, 3rd president (principal)
1865–1867: Sophia D. Stoddard 4th president (acting principal)
1867–1872: Helen M. French, 5th president (principal)
1872–1883: Julia E. Ward, 6th president (principal)
1883–1889: Elizabeth Blanchard, 7th president (principal and president)
1889:      Mary A. Brigham, 8th president (president elect - died in an accident)
1889–1890: Louisa F. Cowles, 9th president (acting president)
1890–1900: Elizabeth Storrs Mead, 10th president
1900–1937: Mary Emma Woolley, 11th president
1937–1957: Roswell G. Ham, 12th president (first male president of MHC)
1954:      Meribeth E. Cameron, served as acting president for part of 1954 while President Ham was on leave
1957–1968: Richard Glenn Gettell, 13th president
1966:      Meribeth E. Cameron, served as acting president part of 1966 while President Gettell was on leave
1968–1969: Meribeth E. Cameron, 14th president (acting president)
1969–1978: David Truman, 15th president
1978–1995: Elizabeth Topham Kennan '60, 16th president
1984:      Joseph Ellis, served as acting president for part of 1984 while President Kennan was on leave
1995:      Peter Berek, served as interim president in fall 1995
1996–2010: Joanne V. Creighton, 17th president
2002:      Beverly Daniel Tatum, served as acting president for part of 2002 while President Creighton was on leave
2010–2016: Lynn Pasquerella '80, 18th president
2016–2022: Sonya Stephens, 19th president
2022-2023 (expected): Beverly Daniel Tatum, serving as interim president.

Commencement speakers

The following is a list of Mount Holyoke College commencement speakers by year.

Notes

References

Lists of people by university or college in Massachusetts
People